The 1900 Texas Longhorns baseball team represented the Texas Longhorns baseball program for the University of Texas in the 1900 college baseball season.  Maurice Gordon Clarke coached the team in his 1st season at Texas.

Schedule

References

Texas Longhorns baseball seasons
Texas Longhorns Baseball
Texas Longhorns